Castle Wolfenstein is a 1981 action-adventure game that was developed by Muse Software for the Apple II home computer. It is one of the earliest games to be based on stealth mechanics. An Atari 8-bit family port was released in 1982 and was followed by versions for Commodore 64 (1983) and MS-DOS (1984).

The game takes place during World War II. The player takes the role of an Allied prisoner of war who is held captive in the fictional Castle Wolfenstein. After escaping from the cell, the player's objective is to find the Nazis' secret war plans and escape from the castle. Nazi soldier enemies can be dealt with by impersonating, sneaking, or killing them.

The game was received positively amongst critics and became one of the best-selling games of the early 1980s. It is considered to have had a direct influence on modern stealth games. The game was praised for its graphics, and gameplay, but criticized for its long waiting times when opening chests.

Gameplay 

Castle Wolfenstein is a two-dimensional action-adventure game that is played from a top-down perspective using a keyboard, joystick, or paddles. It has also been described as a maze game. There are eight difficulty levels in the game that are determined by the player's rank. The player takes the role of an Allied spy that has been captured by Nazis and imprisoned in a dungeon within Castle Wolfenstein for interrogation by the SS Stormtroopers. While the spy is waiting for interrogation, a dying prisoner emerges from a hiding place and hands the player a fully loaded pistol with 10 rounds, and three grenades before passing away. The objective is to escape from the castle and if the player finds the battle plans before escaping, they will be promoted and the complexity of the subsequent run will be increased, while the castle's layout changes and the game starts again.

The game takes place in a procedurally-generated castle of approximately 60 rooms that house standard Nazi guards and SS Stormtroopers identified by their bulletproof vests marked with the SS insignia. Standard guards can be eliminated with a pistol and have a chance to surrender if the player points a pistol at them even if they have no ammunition, and SS Stormtroopers with grenades because they usually wear body armor. Enemies can be looted once surrendered or after they've been eliminated and can possess ammunition, grenades, and keys which can be used on doors and chests. Doors and chests can be opened more quickly by shooting at them but will attract the guards in the room, and if the chest contains ammunition and grenades, they will explode resulting in immediate death. Chests may contain bulletproof vests, uniforms, and secret documents, or sauerkraut, sausages, and schnapps that do not affect the gameplay. Uniforms allow the player character to pass guards unnoticed, but they are ineffective against SS Stormtroopers. If the player dies from enemy gunfire, the game restarts with the castle's layout preserved and the same chests and guards. If they are killed by their own grenade, the game restarts in a newly generated castle.

Development and release 
Castle Wolfenstein was developed by Silas Warner at Muse Software and the game's cover art was drawn by John Benson.

The game was initially conceptualized as a game set in the mid-1980s in what Warner describes as  "a guy running around rooms" and did not know how to develop the game further. He was uninterested in using space as a setting due to his belief that there were so many of them on the market. The concept changed after Warner watched the 1961 British-American war film The Guns of Navarone and was amazed by the Allied commandos who broke into a German fortress to destroy the German artillery battery. Within the same day, he played Berzerk, a multi-directional shooter arcade game in which the player navigates through a maze with laser-shooting robots. He decided to use the same concept but with Nazi soldiers instead of robots. His idea was to take the basic common concept of an arcade shoot 'em up, where players dodge enemies with the intent of killing them and change the objective to escape the enemy guards and their castle with shooting guards simply a means to an end and not an end in itself.

Warner implemented procedural level generation to the game, which took 35 to 60 seconds to complete before the gameplay of the original Apple version started; as a result, the game produced a new set of 60 rooms, the arrangement of which was nearly always different. He designed the game's architecture using three programs, each of which was on separate floppy disks and later integrated into a single floppy disk. The first one initialized the graphics and shuffled 64 interchangeable floor plans. The second disk governed the behavior of the castle's guards, while the third disk handled the player character's behavior. According to Warner, a lot of work went into synchronizing the programs, and was satisfied with the result. For the soundtrack, he implemented his own voice for the German guards.  Warner recorded his voice using Apple II software called The Voice also published by Muse Software. He used German phrases such as Achtung, Schweinhund, Halt, and five other German phrases.

Muse Software released Castle Wolfenstein in September 1981 for the Apple II and the game was ported to other platforms. It was first ported to the Atari 8-bit family six months after the Apple release, then to the Commodore 64 in 1983 and to MS-DOS in 1984. Following the game's release, a software developed by Moxie, The Great Escape Utility, was marketed in 1983, promising bug fixes to speed up the opening of chests and the startup time of the game. It also allowed players to choose their starting location and gain an unlimited amount of items. The software is regarded as the first commercial trainer in video gaming.

Reception 

According to Harvey Bernstein of Antic, after its release, Castle Wolfenstein "quickly shot to the top of the charts" and became "one of the most popular games for any microcomputer". In the October 1982 issue of Computer Gaming World, associate publisher and game merchandiser Dana Lombardy released an incomplete list of top-selling games as of 30 June 1982, where the game landed in 13th place with 20,000 copies sold. The game ultimately sold about 50,000 copies by 1983.

Creative Computing Video and Arcade Gamess Andrew Brill complained about the Apple version's slow gameplay, which according to Brill is mainly due to the time taken to open chests that contain "completely useless" items, which Brill regarded as the game's "most frustrating feature", but added "thrill of the escape" is "worth the wait". Richard Herring of Ahoy!, reviewing the game's Commodore 64 port, also complained about Castle Wolfensteins slow gameplay, especially the long time it took to open the chests. He also stated that each room must be loaded from the floppy disk, causing a lag when each room is entered. Herring also mentioned a bug, in which if the player character bumps into a wall, the screen "goes into hysterics for a few seconds". Herring added that playing the game with a keyboard is "inconvenient" as the player does not have time to perform game actions quickly enough but concluded by stating Castle Wolfenstein has "simple but effective graphics"  and called the game "addicting". In a 1991 Computer Gaming World survey of strategy and war games, M. Evan Brooks called the game an "arcade classic" stated despite the outdated graphics, it had remained in his "fond memories". In 1996, the same magazine listed Castle Wolfenstein as the 116th best game of all time.

Sequels and follow-ups 

In 1984, Muse Software released a sequel to Castle Wolfenstein titled Beyond Castle Wolfenstein, which has similar graphics and gameplay to its predecessor and contains a number of updates such as the use of a knife, the ability to bribe guards, and a pass system in which guards periodically summon the player character and ask him or her to show the correct pass. Castle Wolfenstein directly influenced the game Wolfenstein 3D, which was developed by id Software. John Romero stated the original idea was to create a 3D Castle Wolfenstein but did not have the rights to the game during development. Many options for the game's title were proposed and rejected and eventually, id Software bought the rights to use Wolfenstein from Silas Warner. The original concept of Wolfenstein 3D changed significantly because the developers decided the core of the gameplay would be fast and simple so features such as the ability to drag and loot fallen enemy soldiers were withdrawn.

Further development by other studios led to the emergence of one of the longest-living video series; as of 2021, there are 13 Wolfenstein games, the most recent of which, Wolfenstein: Youngblood and Wolfenstein: Cyberpilot, are  spin-offs that were released in 2019.

Legacy 
Multiple media outlets considered Castle Wolfenstein to be significant in the shaping of the stealth games genre. Though no more Wolfenstein games were released by Muse Entertainment after Beyond Castle Wolfenstein, Metal Gear series and several other video games took elements and inspiration from the two original games. Casey Alkaisy, marketing manager at DICE, in his review of stealth games on Gamasutra, said the first foundations of the stealth genre were laid down in Pac-Man but its game mechanics only took shape with the advent of Castle Wolfenstein, after which other games using the same ideas began to appear. In its review of the series, Xbox Wire called Castle Wolfenstein a "proto-stealth game" that contains "innovations that would go on to become standards in the stealth genre". When speaking with Retro Gamer, Wolfenstein 3D co-creator John Romero, credited Castle Wolfenstein as the "original stealth shooter".

Silas Warner died in 2004 after a long illness.

References

Citations

Bibliography

External links 
 
 
 
 

1981 video games
Action-adventure games
Apple II games
Atari 8-bit family games
Commodore 64 games
DOS games
Muse Software games
Single-player video games
Stealth video games
Top-down video games
Video games about Nazi Germany
Video games developed in the United States
Video games set in castles
Video games using procedural generation
Wolfenstein
World War II video games